The Western Junior College Athletic Conference (WJCAC) is a junior college athletic conference for many technical and community colleges within the Southwest states of Texas and New Mexico, sponsored by the National Junior College Athletic Association (NJCAA). Conference championships are held in most sports and individuals can be named to All-Conference and All-Academic teams. It is part of NJCAA Region 5.

Member schools

Current members
The WTJCAC currently has 12 full members, all but one are public schools:

Notes

See also
 National Junior College Athletic Association (NJCAA)
 North Texas Junior College Athletic Conference, also in Region 5
 Metro Athletic Conference, also in Region 5

External links
NJCAA Region 5 website
NJCAA website

NJCAA conferences